The 1976 Thomas Cup was the tenth edition of Thomas Cup, the world championship of men's international team badminton (its female counterpart is the Uber Cup). The final rounds contested by qualifying teams were held in Bangkok, Thailand in late May and early June. First played in 1948–49, the Thomas Cup competition was held every three years after that until 1982 and has been held every two years since. For more details on the format of past and present Thomas Cup competition see Wikipedia's general article on the Thomas Cup.

Indonesia won its sixth title after beating Malaysia in the final round.

Teams
26 teams from 4 regions took part in the competition. As defending champion, Indonesia skipped the qualifications and played directly in the second round of the inter-zone ties (team matches), effectively the semifinals of the tournament. As host nation to the inter-zone phase of the tournament, Thailand was exempt from qualifications and played directly in the first round of the inter-zone ties.

Australasian zone
 (exempt from qualifying rounds)

Asian zone

 (exempt from qualifying rounds)

European zone

Panamerican zone

Qualification (Intra-zone) summary

Denmark again prevailed in the European zone but only after two tough battles. In the zone semifinal against England. Flemming Delfs and Elo Hansen led the way to a 6–3 victory, as Svend Pri, recovering from injury, was kept out of the doubles. Englishman David Eddy's unbeaten record in Thomas Cup play for England dating from the 1969-1970 series was broken in the second set of doubles matches, but only after the outcome of the tie had been determined. In the zone final against Sweden, which had beaten West Germany comfortably, Denmark's slightly greater depth enabled it to survive 5–4 in the last match of the tie. Veteran singles star Sture Johnsson still excelled for Sweden, but its team now depended most on Thomas Kihlstrom, something of a late bloomer, but fast becoming one of the best all-around players in the world.

Canada won the Pan American zone by defeating the USA and Mexico, both by 6–3 scores. Against the USA it swept the five singles matches to more than offset a doubles deficit. It was almost the reverse against Mexico, with Canada losing three of the five singles but sweeping the doubles. Notable in the tie between Canada and the USA was the creditable play of a bevy of ultra-veterans: Wayne Macdonnell (who won two singles matches), Channarong Ratanaseangsuang, and Raphi Kanchanaraphi, for Canada, all in their mid to late thirties, and 44-year-old Jim Poole for the U.S. In the Canada versus Mexico tie, Mexico's Roy Diaz Gonzalez, playing in his third Cup series at only 22, remained undefeated in Pan American zone singles

With Iran and Taiwan defaulting opening ties in the Australasian zone, New Zealand needed only to defeat Australia (9–0; though some matches were close) to advance to the inter-zone playoffs for the second time. It was the fifth campaign for New Zealand's Richard Purser whose Thomas Cup experience dated from the days when Australia had the upper hand between the two.

The Asian zone, usually the most formidable one in the Thomas Cup draw, seemed to offer better odds to dark-horse contenders this time. Indonesia as defending champion was once again exempt from the qualifying rounds, as was 1973 zone winner Thailand as host nation to the inter-zone ties. The typically talented Malaysian and Japanese squads were each in something of an intergenerational transition. Malaysia's well known players of the late 1960s and early 1970s had all retired and Ippei Kojima was the last mainstay from Japan's highly competitive teams of 1967 and 1970. Nonetheless, Japan easily advanced over Hong Kong and South Korea in the eastern section of the draw. In the western section India relied on 20-year-old Prakash Padukone's wins in both of his singles and both of his doubles matches to narrowly defeat an improved Pakistan 5–4. In the next round, against a very young and green Malaysian team, three Padukone wins put India on the verge of victory at 4–1. Malaysia, however, won all the remaining matches, the last when Padukone and Asif Parpia were beaten in three games by Cheah Hong Chong and Dominic Soong, to advance to the zone final. There the young Malaysians defeated Japan 6–3, thus helping to assuage the memory of Malaysia's collapse in the zone final against Thailand in 1973.

Inter-zone playoffs

First round

Second round

The inter-zone ties (team matches) were held in Bangkok, Thailand in late May and early June. 1973 runner-up Denmark and defending champion Indonesia received byes and awaited the winners of Malaysia versus New Zealand and Canada versus Thailand respectively. New Zealand's fate was sealed when it could not break through against the Malaysian singles lineup of Phua Ah Hua, Saw Swee Leong, and James Selvaraj, despite some competitive matches. New Zealand doubles victories, two of them after the tie had been decided, made the final score 6–3. The Purser brothers, Bryan and older brother Richard both played well in defeat for the Kiwis. The contest between Canada and host Thailand was quite lopsided. Though the Canadians had replaced several of its Pan American zone team members with younger players, it had retained the veteran ex-Thais Raphi Kanchanaraphi and Channarong Ratanaseangsuang, two heroes of Thailand's run to the Thomas Cup final a full fifteen years earlier. The old Thais could not match the young Thai doubles pairs, though, in extending one match to three games, they performed as well as anyone else on their team. Canada's singles number one Jamie McKee could average only six points a game against Thailand's Bandid Jaiyen and Surapong Suharitdamrong. Only one of the singles matches was moderately close in a 9–0 Thai victory

The first inter-zone semifinal between Denmark and Malaysia was the shocker of the series. The Danes once again fielded a squad of "name" players (complete with three alternates), though a few were now on the downside of their careers. By contrast the Malaysian team consisted of relative unknowns, though three consecutive hard-fought ties had given them valuable experience. The redoubtable Svend Pri, now 31, led off for Denmark with a decisive straight games win over Phu Ah Hua. In the next match, however, Flemming Delfs, less than a year away from capturing the World Singles Championship in the familiar Scandinavian climate, faltered in the heat and humidity after winning the first game against Saw Swee Leong. Those results set the pattern for the tie; Denmark could win matches that counted only when Pri was on the court. At 4–3 in favor of Malaysia Pri was finally unable to carry partner Steen Skovgaard to victory against Dominic Soong and Cheah Hong Chong. The jubilant young Malaysians had reached the Thomas Cup final against form, losing an anticlimactic final match to make the score 5–4.

The outcome of the other semifinal was never really in doubt. Though host Thailand had received a bye into the inter-zone matches, it had also received "the short straw" by being placed in the Indonesian half of the draw. The performance of the diminutive but gifted Bandid Jaiyen, however, did offer some balm for Thailand's wounded pride. He had gained Thailand's only point against Indonesia in the previous Thomas Cup series, and did so again on the first night of play by fighting back from the brink of a straight games defeat to wear down powerhouse Iie Sumirat 15-5 in the third. Though Jaiyen played creditably on the second night against the iconic Rudy Hartono,  he was beaten at 11 and 7. Surapong Suharitdamrong, the Thai number two, could collect only eleven points in four games against Hartono and Sumirat. The one close doubles match came after Indonesia had already clinched the tie to play in its seventh Thomas Cup final in seven attempts.

Final

In reaching the 1976 Thomas Cup final a young Malaysian team had done what vastly more experienced and accomplished Malaysian team members had failed to do in 1973. Their fine run, however, came to an abrupt end against juggernaut Indonesia in perhaps the most one-sided championship tie in Thomas Cup history. Replacing Sumirat in one of the top singles positions for Indonesia, rising star Liem Swie King weathered close first games against both Phua Ah Hua and Saw Swee Leong before slamming the door against both in the second game. Hartono was never threatened. Malaysia's Dominic Soong and Cheah Hong Chong captured the first game against Tjun Tjun and Johan Wahjudi, but this was the extent of the Malaysian challenge. By a nine to zero final tally Indonesia retained the Thomas Cup. It was the first time that the championship round had ended in a shutout.

References

External links
 tangkis.tripod.com
 Mike's Badminton Populorum 

Thomas Cup
Thomas Cup
Badminton tournaments in Thailand
Thomas & Uber Cup